Svetlana Vladimirovna Ustinova (born 1 May 1982) is a Russian actress, most notable for appearing in the film Hardcore Henry.

Early life
Ustinova was born in Severodvinsk, Arkhangelsk Oblast, Russian SFSR, Soviet Union (now Russia), the daughter of Tatyana and Vladimir Ustinov. She studied at Severodvinsk school number 28. After grade 7, she went to Severodvinsk City School number 14, from which she graduated in 1999. She was engaged in ballroom dancing. Ustinova studied at Moscow Economics and Statistics University, but in the second year transferred to the Finance Academy. After the fourth year she left the academy and enrolled in the Gerasimov Institute of Cinematography, with Vladimir Grammatikov as professor.

In 2005, having passed the casting, she was approved for the lead role of Dashka in the Pjotr Buslov film Boomer. the second film.

Personal life
In 2009, Ustinova married Ukrainian director Mark Gorobets, and subsequently divorced him.  She is now in a relationship with producer Ilya (Will) Stewart.

Filmography

References

External links

Svetlana Ustinova on Ruskino
News article about Ustinova starring in the sequel "Boomer"
Photo album of Ustinova
Interview with Zoom Central Asia

1982 births
Living people
People from Severodvinsk
Russian film actresses
Russian television actresses
21st-century Russian actresses
Actresses from Moscow
Gerasimov Institute of Cinematography alumni